Evgeny Yaroslavlev (born April 6, 1994) is a Russian professional ice hockey goaltender. He is currently playing with Ak Bars Kazan of the Kontinental Hockey League (KHL).

Yaroslavlev made his Kontinental Hockey League debut playing with Ak Bars Kazan during the 2013–14 season.

References

External links

1994 births
Living people
Russian ice hockey goaltenders